The 2009 season was the Kansas City Chiefs' 40th in the National Football League (NFL), their 50th overall, and their first under head coach Todd Haley and general manager Scott Pioli. The Chiefs attempted to improve on their 2–14 record from 2008 with the third overall selection in the 2009 NFL Draft. In 2009, the Chiefs also honored the induction of Derrick Thomas, the team's former linebacker from 1989 to 1999, into the Pro Football Hall of Fame. Thomas' jersey number 58 was officially retired by the franchise after having been unissued since Thomas' death in 2000.

The fate of head coach Herman Edwards and his staff remained uncertain after the end of the 2008 season in which the Chiefs finished with a franchise-worst 2–14 record. The team was 6–26 in the past two years under Edwards, who had one year left on a four-year, $12 million contract and was lobbying to be allowed another year to get his rebuilding movement off the ground. Team owner Clark Hunt voiced his support of Edwards, but he had also said the new general manager Scott Pioli would have "significant input" into the decision on whether to retain him. On January 23, the Chiefs fired Edwards, and on February 5, Todd Haley was hired as the 11th head coach in Chiefs franchise history and signed a four-year contract.

For the 2009 season under the Pioli/Haley regime, the Chiefs switched from a 4–3 defense to a 3–4 defensive strategy.

Although finishing the regular season last in the AFC West with a record of 4–12, the Chiefs doubled their win record from the previous season. The Chiefs did not have a single player named to the Pro Bowl for the first time since 1978 and only the 3rd time in franchise history.

Offseason

AFL anniversary season
In select games, the Chiefs, as well as the other founding teams of the American Football League, will wear "throwback" uniforms to celebrate the AFL's 50th anniversary and the 1962 Dallas Texans team that won the AFL Championship. The Chiefs "throwback" look will feature helmets with gray facemasks and a Texas-shaped decal with a gold star showing the location of the city of Dallas, Texas. From 1960 to 1962, the team was known as the Dallas Texans and played at the Cotton Bowl alongside the NFL's Dallas Cowboys. Jerseys for the club's "throwback" games will include a patch that honors the AFL's 50th anniversary. Kansas City will wear these replica uniforms when they host the Dallas Cowboys at Arrowhead Stadium and against two AFC West opponents yet to be determined (one home date and one away date).

The team's decision to wear the Texans' helmets started a controversy with some Chiefs fans who believed the team needed to honor the franchise's years in Kansas City, not Dallas. A petition by Sports Radio 810 WHB in Kansas City states that "the Chiefs have a responsibility to help promote the state and region that have supported them financially through stadium taxes, ticket sales, parking fees, concessions and merchandise sales for 47 years."

General manager search

Following the resignation of Carl Peterson, the Chiefs' general manager, chief executive officer, and team president, a search for the team's new general manager began. Chiefs owner Clark Hunt said he intended to split the three jobs that Peterson held for nearly 20 years, looking for "a shrewd evaluator of football talent" at the general manager's position. Possible candidates included former Chiefs head coach Marty Schottenheimer, Indianapolis Colts vice president of football operations Chris Polian, Tampa Bay Buccaneers director of pro personnel Mark Dominik, former Denver Broncos general manager Ted Sundquist, former Tennessee Titans general manager Floyd Reese, San Diego Chargers director of player personnel Jimmy Raye III, Baltimore Ravens director of college scouting Eric DeCosta, and New England Patriots vice president of football operations Scott Pioli. Hunt said he would hire a new person to overlook football operations and a second person to be in charge of the team's business operations. That job, team president, was given to longtime team executive vice president Denny Thum.

Pioli reportedly sought "total control" of an organization and was also pursued by the Cleveland Browns to be their new general manager. Pioli's supposed intentions of "total control" could have possibly eliminated him from the Chiefs' job. Hunt had kept his search almost entirely leak-proof, instructing subordinates that only he is to speak to the situation. Hunt also intended to be thorough and patient in his search for the Chiefs' new general manager. Pioli was reportedly the Chiefs' number one candidate and on January 13 the Chiefs hired Pioli as general manager. The official statement from the Chiefs said that Pioli would "have final say over all football operations and report directly to (Clark) Hunt." The Chiefs introduced Pioli the following day at team headquarters in Kansas City.

Coaching changes

Hiring Todd Haley
The decision to hire Scott Pioli as general manager likely meant that head coach Herman Edwards would not return for a fourth season as Chiefs head coach. The Kansas City Star reported that according to two coaches, Edwards and his staff could have been dismissed as soon as Wednesday, January 14, the day when Pioli was introduced in Kansas City. At his press conference, Pioli did not rule out Edwards being retained as the team's head coach. Hunt said publicly that he wanted Edwards to return in 2009, but Pioli would have "significant input" in the final decision.

Several candidates were mentioned as possible replacements for Edwards even before he had been fired. The most notable names mentioned were Todd Haley, the offensive coordinator of the 2008 NFC Champion Arizona Cardinals, New York Giants defensive coordinator Steve Spagnuolo, and Mike Shanahan, the former head coach of the Chiefs' rival Raiders and Broncos franchises. Other possible candidates included Jon Gruden, Leslie Frazier, Winston Moss, Kirk Ferentz, Jason Garrett, and even Scott Pioli's father-in-law, Bill Parcells.

Edwards was fired on January 23, and ESPN's Chris Mortensen reported later that evening that the Chiefs were targeting Mike Shanahan to become the next head coach. Mortensen initially reported that the Chiefs were negotiating on a contract with Shanahan. The report was later denied by Shanahan himself.

After a long period in which Haley was considered the front-runner for the head coaching position, there was concern as to whether the Chiefs would violate the Rooney Rule by immediately hiring Haley. The Rooney Rule, named after Pittsburgh Steelers owner Dan Rooney, specifies that NFL teams must give fair interviews to minority candidates whenever a head coaching position comes open. Some minority coaches were reportedly turning down offers from the Chiefs since Haley was the presumed target for the coaching vacancy. The Chiefs negotiated with Haley following the Cardinals' loss in Super Bowl XLIII, and Haley accepted the coaching position on February 5. Haley was introduced as head coach the following day.

Defensive coordinator Gunther Cunningham was hired by the Detroit Lions for the same position. Cunningham had been the defensive coordinator for the Chiefs from 1995 to 1998 and 2004 to 2008. He also served as the team's head coach from 1999 to 2000. The Chiefs also lost secondary coach David Gibbs to the Houston Texans and Mike Priefer to the Denver Broncos. Once Todd Haley was hired, the Chiefs fired tight ends coach Jon Embree, defensive assistant/assistant linebacker coach Michael Ketchum, running backs coach Curtis Modkins, offensive assistant/quality control coach Kevin Patullo, and wide receivers coach Eric Price.

Assistant coaches and administration
For Haley's new coaching staff, the Chiefs hired Joel Collier, Gary Gibbs (linebackers), Steve Hoffman (special teams), Bill Muir (offensive line), Clancy Pendergast (defensive coordinator), Pat Perles, Dedric Ward (wide receivers), Ronnie Bradford (defensive assistant), Nick Sirianni (offensive quality control coach), and Maurice Carthon (assistant head coach). From Herman Edwards' staff, Chan Gailey was retained as offensive coordinator, and Bob Bicknell switched from offensive line to tight ends coach, and Joe D'Alessandris was retained as assistant offensive line coach. The Chiefs also relieved duties of several scouts and player personnel assistants once the 2009 NFL Draft concluded.

Initially there were doubts as to whether Chan Gailey would be retained under Todd Haley's coaching staff, as Haley had just concluded a successful stint as offensive coordinator at Arizona. After the Chiefs lost their first three preseason games, Gailey was relieved of duties and Haley was expected to assume offensive play-calling duties.

Roster changes and trade demands
Immediately following the Chiefs' 2008 season finale loss to the Cincinnati Bengals, running back Larry Johnson voiced his intention to seek a trade in the offseason. Johnson was involved in legal troubles in 2008 and his production on the field declined. As a result of his legal troubles, in March 2009 Johnson pleaded guilty to the two incidents that occurred in 2008 and was sentenced to two years probation. Johnson served suspensions from the NFL in 2008 and is not expected to receive further punishment from the charges.

Guard Brian Waters had issues with Todd Haley shortly after Haley's hiring, saying the coach had been disrespectful of him during a meeting, then that new general manager Scott Pioli refused to meet with him privately. Waters later told the Kansas City Star that he wanted to be traded and did not attend any of the team's voluntary offseason workouts. Newly acquired linebacker Mike Vrabel also did not attend offseason workouts citing his rights with the league's collective bargaining agreement.

Tight end Tony Gonzalez reiterated his intentions for a trade in March 2009 after a failed attempt in October 2008. He was eventually traded in April to the Atlanta Falcons.

Gonzalez lobbied for the Chiefs to keep Tyler Thigpen as the team's starting quarterback when Gonzalez was still with the team and when Matt Cassel was not yet on the Chiefs roster. Though he appeared to be the Chiefs' lone quarterback who would remain in their plans for 2009, especially after Damon Huard was released Thigpen was not considered a lock for the starting job. Thigpen competed with Matt Cassel for the starting quarterback position.

Departures

In February, the Chiefs released linebacker Donnie Edwards, quarterback Damon Huard, tight end Michael Merritt, and cornerback Patrick Surtain. In March, quarterback Quinn Gray was released. and in April wide receiver Will Franklin, tackle Andrew Carnahan, linebacker Curtis Gatewood, and wide receiver Kevin Robinson were released.

On April 23 the Chiefs traded tight end Tony Gonzalez to the Atlanta Falcons in exchange for a second-round draft pick in the 2010 NFL Draft. In 2008 Gonzalez asked Chiefs management for a trade but negotiations failed and new general manager Scott Pioli reiterated that Gonzalez was initially not offered in trades for the 2009 season but agreed when the Falcons offered a second-round pick. Gonzalez had sought a trade in the 2008 season but several attempts failed.

At the conclusion of the preseason, the Chiefs released 13 players to reach the 53-player limit. Players released were safety Bernard Pollard, wide receiver Ashley Lelie, wide receiver Taurus Johnson, defensive tackle Derek Lokey, safety Ricky Price, and linebacker Zach Thomas. cornerback Jackie Bates, tight end Tom Crabtree, defensive end Dion Gales, defensive end Bobby Greenwood, guard Darryl Harris, running back Javarris Williams and wide receiver Rodney Wright were added to the practice squad.

After the first regular season game, the Chiefs waived linebacker Turk McBride. After the third game, the Chiefs traded quarterback Tyler Thigpen to the Miami Dolphins for an undisclosed draft pick.

Additions
Despite having several needs to be addressed and nearly $35 million in salary cap room, the Chiefs were criticized for being "quiet" in free-agency after the Cassel/Vrabel trade, primarily adding back-up players for depth.

In March, the Chiefs signed linebacker Darrell Robertson, wide receiver C. J. Jones, cornerback Travis Daniels, linebacker Corey Mays, wide receiver Bobby Engram, linebacker Monty Beisel, wide receiver Terrance Copper. and guard Mike Goff.

In April, the Chiefs signed wide receiver Rodney Wright, long snapper Tanner Purdum, linebacker Zach Thomas, tight end Sean Ryan, tight end Tony Curtis, and center Eric Ghiaciuc.

In June, the Chiefs signed safety Mike Brown.

In August, the Chiefs signed wide receiver Amani Toomer but he was later released at the end of the preseason.

In September, the Chiefs signed wide receiver Bobby Wade.

In November, the Chiefs signed wide receiver Chris Chambers.

Cassel/Vrabel trade

On the first day of free agency (February 27), the Chiefs acquired linebacker Mike Vrabel from the Patriots for an undisclosed draft pick. The Boston Globe speculated that it would be part of a bigger trade involving quarterback Matt Cassel. The next day, the Chiefs confirmed the acquisition of both Vrabel and Cassel from New England in exchange for their second-round draft selection in the 2009 NFL Draft (#34 overall).

Reactions to the trade were mixed and it was called "monumentally lopsided" with the Chiefs "clearly (getting) the better end of the deal." Don Banks of Sports Illustrated called the Chiefs the "big winners" of the first weekend of NFL free agency and the Patriots' compensation "laughably low", but the best they could get in return. The trade was done mainly because the Patriots could not keep two quarterbacks on their roster that took up $29.2 million of salary cap space, so it was not a matter of if the Patriots would trade Cassel, but when. The Patriots also had Tom Brady under contract, who was recovering from a knee-injury suffered in a 2008 game against the Chiefs.

On July 15 the Chiefs signed Cassel to six-year contract extension worth a total of $63 million.

Free agency

2009 NFL Draft
The Chiefs selected third overall in the 2009 NFL Draft. After selecting a league-high 13 players in the 2008 Draft, the Chiefs were scheduled to make their standard seven selections pending trades prior to trading away their second-round draft pick to New England for Matt Cassel and Mike Vrabel, leaving them with just six choices. The Chiefs were later awarded the 256th and final selection in the 2009 NFL Draft, making them effectively choose "Mr. Irrelevant." The player chosen was K Ryan Succop, who was the Chiefs' first "Mr. Irrelevant" since the 1970 NFL Draft when DB Rayford Jenkins was chosen by the team from Alcorn A&M.

The Chiefs selected defensive end Tyson Jackson third overall. Jackson was the third consecutive first-round pick by the Chiefs to have played collegiately for the LSU Tigers. All terms of the contracts for the 2009 draft picks were undisclosed, but ESPN reported that Jackson signed a five-year contract worth $57 million, with $31 million guaranteed.

Notes:
 (Draft day trade) Obtained Carolina's seventh round selection (#237) via the Miami Dolphins. In exchange, the Dolphins received the Chiefs' 2010 seventh round selection.

Final roster

Staff

Preseason
The Chiefs conducted training camp at the University of Wisconsin–River Falls for the 19th and final consecutive year. The team will move training camp to St. Joseph, Missouri in 2010. They lost all four games in the preseason to the Houston Texans, Minnesota Vikings, Seattle Seahawks, and St. Louis Rams (for the Missouri Governor's Cup). In the Chiefs' game against the Seahawks, QB Matt Cassel suffered a sprained Medial collateral ligament (MCL), leaving his status as starting quarterback for opening day in doubt. The offense for the Chiefs struggled in all four games, scoring only 42 points in four games and the offensive line suffered numerous breakdowns which led to Cassel's injury. The offensive struggles led to offensive coordinator Chan Gailey's firing and head coach Todd Haley assuming playcalling duties.

Schedule

Regular season

Schedule

Note: Intra-division opponents are in bold text.

* These three games were among the 16 that the NFL designated as "AFL Legacy Games", in honor of the 50th anniversary of the AFL. The Chiefs (formerly the Dallas Texans) wore their throwback uniforms during those three games, as did the Cowboys, Chargers, and Raiders.

Game summaries

Week 1: at Baltimore Ravens

The Chiefs began their season at M&T Bank Stadium against the Baltimore Ravens. Due to his injured knee, quarterback Matt Cassel was unable to play, so Brodie Croyle got the start. Despite completing 16-of-24 passes for 177 yards and two touchdowns, the Chiefs lost to the Ravens 38–24, and Croyle fell to 0–9 as a starter.

Kansas City trailed in the first quarter as Ravens kicker Steven Hauschka got a 44-yard field goal, followed by quarterback Joe Flacco completing a 3-yard touchdown pass to running back Willis McGahee. In the second quarter, the Chiefs got on the board as safety Jon McGraw recovered a blocked punt in the end zone for a touchdown. In the third quarter, Kansas City took the lead as Croyle completed a 2-yard touchdown pass to wide receiver Dwayne Bowe, yet Baltimore answered with Flacco completing a 9-yard touchdown pass to tight end Todd Heap. What followed was a back-and-forth battle in the fourth quarter. Chiefs kicker Ryan Succop got a 53-yard field goal, but the Ravens replied with fullback Le'Ron McClain getting a 1-yard touchdown run. Kansas City would stay close as Croyle completed a 10-yard touchdown pass to tight end Sean Ryan, but Baltimore would pull away as Flacco completed a 31-yard touchdown pass to wide receiver Mark Clayton and McGahee getting a 1-yard touchdown run.

With the loss, the Chiefs began their season at 0–1.

Week 2: vs. Oakland Raiders

Hoping to rebound from their tough road loss to the Ravens, the Chiefs played their Week 2 home opener against their AFC West foe, the Oakland Raiders. Kansas City would score in the first quarter as rookie kicker Ryan Succop got a 23-yard field goal. In the second quarter, the Raiders tied the game as kicker Sebastian Janikowski made a 48-yard field goal. Oakland would take the lead in the third quarter as Janikowski nailed a 54-yard field goal. In the fourth quarter, the Chiefs would retake the lead as quarterback Matt Cassel completed a 29-yard touchdown pass to wide receiver Dwayne Bowe. However, the Raiders sealed the win as running back Darren McFadden got a 5-yard touchdown run.

With the loss, Kansas City fell to 0–2.

Week 3: at Philadelphia Eagles

Still searching for their first win of the season, the Chiefs flew to Lincoln Financial Field for a Week 3 interconference duel with the Philadelphia Eagles. Kansas City would trail early in the first quarter as Eagles running back LeSean McCoy got a 5-yard touchdown run and quarterback Kevin Kolb got a 1-yard touchdown run. The Chiefs would get on the board with quarterback Matt Cassel's 13-yard touchdown pass to wide receiver Mark Bradley, but Philadelphia came right back with Kolb's 64-yard touchdown pass to wide receiver DeSean Jackson and kicker David Akers' 29-yard field goal.

Kansas City's deficit would increase as Akers nailed a 38-yard field goal in the third quarter. In the fourth quarter, the Eagles would put the game away with Kolb's 35-yard touchdown pass to tight end Brent Celek. Afterwards, the Chiefs would end the game with Cassel's 9-yard touchdown pass to wide receiver Bobby Wade.

With the loss, Kansas City fell to 0–3.

Week 4: vs. New York Giants

After a brutal road loss to the Eagles, the Chiefs went home for a Week 4 interconference duel with the New York Giants. Kansas City would trail in the first quarter with quarterback Eli Manning completing a 3-yard touchdown pass to wide receiver Steve Smith. Afterwards, the Chiefs would get on the board with rookie kicker Ryan Succop's 34-yard field goal. In the second quarter, New York would answer with Manning hooking up with Smith again on a 25-yard touchdown pass. Then, the Giants would close out the half with former Chiefs kicker Lawrence Tynes making a 25-yard field goal.

After Tynes' 40-yard field goal in the third quarter, New York would finish their scoring in the fourth quarter with quarterback Eli Manning's 54-yard touchdown pass to wide receiver Hakeem Nicks. Kansas City tried to rally with quarterback Matt Cassel completing a 1-yard touchdown pass to tight end Sean Ryan (followed by a failed 2-point conversion) and a 2-yard touchdown pass to wide receiver Bobby Wade.

With the loss, the Chiefs fell to 0–4.

Week 5: vs. Dallas Cowboys

Still looking to acquire their first win of the year, the Chiefs stayed at home, donned their Dallas Texans throwbacks, and played a Week 5 interconference duel with the Dallas Cowboys. After a scoreless first quarter, Kansas City got out of the gates in the second quarter as kicker Ryan Succop made a 47-yard field goal and quarterback Matt Cassel completed a 1-yard touchdown pass to linebacker Mike Vrabel. Afterwards, the Cowboys closed out the opening half with a 22-yard field goal from kicker Nick Folk.

The Chiefs went back to work in the third quarter with Succop booting a 38-yard field goal, yet Dallas began to rally with a 36-yard touchdown run from running back Tashard Choice. Dallas would take the lead in the fourth quarter as Folk nailed a 28-yard field goal and quarterback Tony Romo found wide receiver Miles Austin on a 59-yard touchdown pass, yet Kansas City would tie the game as Cassel hooked up with wide receiver Dwayne Bowe on a 16-yard touchdown pass. However, the Cowboys won it in overtime as Romo threw the game-ending 60-yard touchdown pass to Austin.

With the tough loss, the Chiefs fell to 0–5.

Week 6: at Washington Redskins

Following a tough overtime loss to the Cowboys, the Chiefs flew to FedExField for a Week 6 interconference duel with the Washington Redskins.

After a scoreless first quarter, Chiefs kicker Ryan Succop booted a 39-yard field goal for the only score of the half.
In the third quarter, the Redskins took the lead with a 40-yard and a 28-yard field goal from kicker Shaun Suisham, but Kansas City tied it up with Succop's 46-yard field goal. In the fourth quarter, Succop gave the Chiefs the lead with a 46-yard and a 24-yard field, but it was the defense that closed the game out for Kansas City, as DE/OLB Tamba Hali sacked quarterback Todd Collins in his own end zone for a safety with under a minute to play.

With the win, the Chiefs improved to 1–5.

Week 7: vs. San Diego Chargers

Coming off their road win over the Redskins, the Chiefs went home, donned their Dallas Texans throwbacks, and played a Week 7 AFL Legacy game with the San Diego Chargers. Kansas City would find themselves trailing in the first quarter as Chargers quarterback Philip Rivers completed a 3-yard touchdown pass to wide receiver Malcom Floyd, followed by a 10-yard touchdown pass to wide receiver Vincent Jackson. San Diego would add onto their lead in the second quarter with a 20-yard and a 39-yard field goal from kicker Nate Kaeding.

The Chiefs would get onto the board in the third quarter with quarterback Matt Cassel completing a 7-yard touchdown pass to wide receiver Dwayne Bowe, but the Chargers kept their momentum going with Rivers finding running back Darren Sproles on a 58-yard touchdown pass. In the fourth quarter, San Diego sealed the win with Kaeding's 19-yard field goal and fullback Jacob Hester recovering a blocked punt in the end zone for a touchdown.

With the loss, Kansas City went into their bye week at 1–6.

Suspension of Larry Johnson
Larry Johnson was suspended for two weeks after he made offensive comments about Todd Haley and made offensive comments about homosexuals on Twitter and in public.

Week 9: at Jacksonville Jaguars

After their bye week, the Chiefs flew to Jacksonville Municipal Stadium for an Intraconference Duel with the Jaguars. While the Chiefs got on the board first with Ryan Succop nailing a 45-yard goal, they fell behind when Rashad Jennings ran from the 28-yard line to the end zone for a touchdown. In the second quarter Ryan Succop made a 21-yard field goal, and then the Jaguars scored when David Garrard completed a 61-yard touchdown pass to Mike Sims-Walker. The only score in the third quarter was when Josh Scobee hit a 27-yard field goal. In the fourth quarter the Chiefs fell further behind when Maurice Jones-Drew got a 10-yard touchdown run. The Chiefs tried to come back with Matt Cassel completing a 54-yard and a 5-yard touchdown pass to Chris Chambers (Second time round the two-point conversion was made when Matt Cassel passed to Jamaal Charles) but couldn't go any further thanks to the Jaguars' defense resulting in a loss.

With the loss, the Chiefs fell to 1–7.

Week 10: at Oakland Raiders

Trying to snap a two-game losing streak, the Chiefs flew to the Oakland–Alameda County Coliseum, donned their Dallas Texans throwbacks, and played a Week 10 AFC Legacy game with perennial rival, the Oakland Raiders.  Kansas City would trail in the first quarter as Raiders running back Justin Fargas got a 1-yard touchdown run.  The Chiefs would get on the board with rookie kicker Ryan Succop getting a 50-yard field goal, but Oakland would strike back as kicker Sebastian Janikowski got a 50-yard field goal.  Kansas City would take the lead in the second quarter with a 44-yard touchdown run from running back Jamaal Charles, followed by Succop nailing a 25-yard field goal.  After a scoreless third quarter, Succop would come through for the Chiefs in the fourth quarter with a 31-yard field goal.

With the win, Kansas City improved to 2–7.

Week 11: vs. Pittsburgh Steelers

The Chiefs returned home to host the Steelers in an attempt to create the biggest upset of the week and get their first back-to-back wins since 2007.  Optimism grew quickly as Jamaal Charles ran the opening kick 97 yards for a touchdown, starting the game with a 7–0 Chiefs lead.

The Steelers dominated the rest of the first half with 20:45 time of possession, going into halftime with a 17–7 lead.  The Chiefs' defense began to pressure Ben Roethlisberger in the third quarter, forcing two interceptions (both by Andy Studebaker in his first NFL start).  By the fourth quarter, the Chiefs tied the game up at 17–17.  The fourth quarter resulted in a touchdown each, sending the game into overtime.

The Steelers won the toss in overtime, but failed to get within field goal range.  Of note, Roethlisberger suffered a knee to the head concussion and was replaced by Charlie Batch.  The Chiefs took over at the 20 and, after a 61-yard catch and run by Chris Chambers, Ryan Succop kicked the winning 22-yard field goal.  With the win, the Chiefs improved to 3–7 and snapped a 10-game home losing streak, the longest in team history.

Week 12: at San Diego Chargers

Coming off their win against the Steelers, the Chiefs went on the road for an AFC West rivalry match against the San Diego Chargers. In the first quarter the Chiefs trailed early as QB Philip Rivers got a 19-yard touchdown pass to TE Antonio Gates. The Chiefs would reply to tie the game with QB Matt Cassel making a 7-yard touchdown pass to WR Chris Chambers, until they fell back again with RB LaDainian Tomlinson getting a 1-yard touchdown run, then Rivers hooking up with Gates again on a 15-yard touchdown pass, then DB Paul Oliver returned a fumble 40 yards for a touchdown.

In the third quarter the Chiefs' struggle continued as RB LaDainian Tomlinson got a 3-yard touchdown run. They tried to come back with RB Jamaal Charles getting a 2-yard touchdown run, but the Chargers would pull away with kicker Nate Kaeding making a 55-yard field goal. In the fourth quarter the problem got worse when a penalty on Matt Cassel was enforced in the end zone for a safety, giving the Chargers 2 points. The final score was made when Kaeding booted a 23-yard field goal.

With the loss, the Chiefs fell to 3–8.

Week 13: vs. Denver Broncos

The Chiefs defense began the game by demonstrating how unpredictable they have been all season.  After giving up three plays of 10 yards or more, Mike Brown intercepted what would likely have been a touchdown pass, giving the Chiefs offense a chance to take the field.  After a short run and two incomplete passes, the Chiefs punted back to Denver.  The Chiefs defense nearly forced the Broncos to a three-and-out, but the drive was kept going by a Ron Edwards face mask call.  The result was a Kyle Orton to Daniel Graham touchdown pass.

The Chiefs offense responded by putting together a relatively long series that began at the KC 31 and lasted 20 plays, ending in a 22-yard Ryan Succop field goal.  After a couple possession changes, the Broncos answered with a series that included three Correll Buckhalter rushes for over 10 yards, ending in a Knowshon Moreno rushing touchdown.  The Chiefs would respond before the half with another field goal.

The second began with the Chiefs failing to convert on fourth down and the Broncos scoring on each of their first three possessions.  Before the end of the quarter, Matt Cassel was replaced by Brodie Croyle.  After the Chiefs lost a Jamaal Charles fumble for a touchdown, they recovered a Kyle Orton fumble and eventually turned it into a Jamal Charles rushing touchdown.  The Broncos immediately responded with yet another touchdown.

With the loss, the Chiefs fall to 3–9.

Week 14: vs. Buffalo Bills

With the loss, the Chiefs fell to 3–10.

Week 15: vs. Cleveland Browns

The game was the first home blackout for the Chiefs since 1990.  With the loss, the Chiefs fell to 3–11.

Week 16: at Cincinnati Bengals

With the loss, the Chiefs fell to 3–12.

Week 17: at Denver Broncos

With the win, the Chiefs finished their season at 4–12.  Also, it was 1 of 3 games to help the Steelers get into the playoffs.  However, the Ravens beat the Raiders and the Jets beat the Bengals that same week.

Standings

References

External links

2009 Kansas City Chiefs season at Pro Football Reference
2009 Kansas City Chiefs season at ESPN

Kansas City
Kansas City Chiefs seasons
2009 in sports in Missouri